MaRS Discovery District is a not-for-profit corporation founded in Toronto, Ontario, Canada in 2000. Its stated goal is to commercialize publicly funded medical research and other technologies with the help of local private enterprises and as such is a public-private partnership. As part of its mission MaRS says, "MaRS helps create successful global businesses from Canada's science, technology and social innovation."  , startup companies emerging from MaRS had created more than 4,000 jobs, and in the period of 2011 to 2014 had raised over $750 million in capital investments.

The name MaRS was originally drawn from a file name, and later attributed with the title "Medical and Related Sciences." It has since abandoned this association as it also works in other fields such as information and communications technology, engineering, and social innovation.

Facilities 

It is located on the corner of College Street and University Avenue in the city of Toronto’s Discovery District, adjacent to the University of Toronto and its affiliated research hospitals at the University Health Network.

The MaRS development consists of two phases.

Phase 1 
MaRS Discovery District Phase 1 was designed by Adamson Associates Architects and includes:

 The Heritage Building (formerly a wing of the Toronto General Hospital),
 The Atrium
 The South Tower
 The Toronto Medical Discovery Tower

The Heritage Building
Inside the Heritage Building's four-storey brick façade (preserved) are tenant spaces occupied by professional services, industry associations, pharmaceutical companies and offices of Canadian universities and the Government of Ontario. In 2006, the MaRS Centre received the Heritage Toronto Award of Excellence for Architectural Conservation and Craftsmanship. The building was designed by Pearson and Darling and opened in 1911. The Heritage building houses a Biosafety level 3 laboratory.

The Atrium
The MaRS atrium is a glass-roofed public thoroughfare that provides walkway access to Heritage Building tenants and retail vendors, as well as access to the South and Medical Discovery Towers. Its bottom level features a sub-dividable conference area that hosts public and private events. MaRS encourages events from across Toronto's arts, culture and broader urban community. The Atrium's lower level also features a media centre, video conferencing rooms and a public food court.

The South Tower
This eight-storey structure houses incubator programs and shared laboratory and research facilities. The , wet lab-capable building spans eight floors in the MaRS Centre. The tower boasts advanced mechanical and electrical systems, floors with enhanced load bearing capabilities and  slab-to-slab clearances.

Occupying the second and third floors of the South Tower — directly above the MaRS corporate offices, is the MaRS Incubator – a dedicated space that houses offices and laboratories for approximately two dozen life science and technology firms.

Toronto Medical Discovery Tower
With  of state-of-the-art wet labs, the 15-storey Toronto Medical Discovery Tower accommodates leading-edge scientific equipment and houses the basic research activities of one of Canada's premier research hospitals, the University Health Network.

Situated on the corner of College and Elizabeth Street, the building was designed with typical research and development lab floors configured with a side core arrangement and sheathed in metal and glass. The tower portions rest on a three-storey limestone podium that aligns with the heights of the adjoining College Wing and the formal landscape forecourt that extends the full block.

The shell and core of the TMDT is designed to accommodate a full lab program based on 80 percent wet lab and 20 percent dry lab. The lab floors have been configured to maximize future flexibility. The mechanical and electrical rooms, power and communication distribution systems, general and special exhaust risers, floor drains and service zones, have been established to allow for fit-out by future tenants.

Phase 1 began operations in 2005.

West Tower 
West Tower (formerly known as Phase 2), designed by Bregman + Hamann Architects, constitutes a  addition to the MaRS centre in the form of a 20-story tower on the complex’s west wing.  The tower was developed by Alexandria Real Estate Equities.  Construction began in late 2007, and was scheduled to be completed in spring 2010. In November 2008, Phase 2 construction was put on hold due to the economic downturn.  Construction resumed in July 2011, with a target completion date of Fall 2013.

In 2011, construction of Phase 2 restarted. Phase 2 construction was expected to be completed in September 2013. Phase 2 of the project was facing criticism because the Government of Ontario provided a bailout for the organization which is facing difficulty leasing the floors. The Ontario Progressive Conservative Party was calling for a full accounting of MaRS Phase 2.  By November 2016, 93% of the building had been leased, with the rest in negotiation.

In 2016, IBM announced plans to join the finTech hub at MaRS.  The hub has financial services companies, including CIBC, Manulife and Moneris.

Supporters
MaRS is supported, in part, by professional service organizations which offer their expertise at no cost through education and training, and advisory hours.

The current list of organizations include:

Criticism

In April 2010, criticism of the $471,874 salary collected by MaRS CEO Ilse Treurnicht in 2008 was raised. It also criticized Liberal government-led funding, lack of accountability and rigor in measuring results, claims of public-private partnerships and the absence of visible minorities among MaRS's team of advisors.

On August 27, 2010, the National Post relayed some of these criticisms

Renewed criticism was published in 2011, pointing in particular to the $100,000 increase in Treurnicht's salary, her $534,000 salary in 2010, and questioning the public and private funding of the Phase II expansion. The Toronto Sun published articles on the topic as well, questioning the high compensation levels at the charitable trust institution.

Initiatives and affiliations 
 The Toronto Discovery District
 California-Canada Strategic Innovation Partnership
 Social Innovation Generation (SiG)
 Creative Convergence Centres Project
 Premier’s Summit Awards
 Canadian Stem Cell Network
 Stockholm Science City
 Net Change Week
 LegalX

References

External links 

 MaRS Entrepreneurs Toolkit
 Press Release for resumption of MaRS 'Phase 2' Expansion 

Buildings and structures in Toronto
Science parks in Canada
High-technology business districts in Canada
Darling and Pearson buildings
Intelligent Community Forum
BSL3 laboratories in Canada